IP over HTTPS ("IP-HTTPS", "MS-IPHTTPS") is a Microsoft network tunneling protocol. The IP-HTTPS protocol transports IPv6 packets across non-IPv6 networks. It does a similar job as the earlier 6to4 or Teredo tunneling mechanisms.

Microsoft preference when deciding between transition protocols
Microsoft used to discourage IP-HTTPS use because it was slow.

For Windows Server 2012, Microsoft changed the internal workings of the protocol, and IP-HTTPS is now the "preferred IPv6 transition technology" for their "DirectAccess" VPN technology.

References

External links
 Official Microsoft open standards document [MS-IPHTTPS]

Network protocols
IPv6 transition technologies